Łatana may refer to the following places in Poland:

Łatana Mała
Łatana Wielka